Lady of the Bedchamber  is the title of a lady-in-waiting holding the official position of personal attendant on a British queen regnant or queen consort. The position is traditionally held by the wife of a peer. A lady of the bedchamber would give instructions to the women of the bedchamber on what their queen wished them to do, or may carry out those duties herself.

The equivalent title and office has historically been used in most European royal courts (Dutch: Dames du Palais; French: Dames or Dame de Palais; German: Hofstaatsdame or Palastdame; Italian: Dame di Corte; Russian: Hofdame or Statsdame; Spanish: Dueña de honor; Swedish: Statsfru).

History

In the Middle Ages, Margaret of France is noted to have had seven ladies of the bedchamber: the three married ones were called dominæ and the four unmarried ones were known as maids of honour. Their task was simply to act as the companions (see lady's companion) and personal attendants to the royal woman.

In a description from 1728, the task of the ladies of the bedchamber was to act as the go-between for the queen and the women of the bedchamber, who had the task to wait upon the queen by helping her wash, dress and undress, and so forth. A woman of the bedchamber worked independently from a lady of the bedchamber and did not take orders from her. However, if a lady of the bedchamber was present, a woman of the bedchamber would always defer to her. If a lady of the bedchamber was present when a woman of the bedchamber arrived to dress the queen, for example, she would not dress the queen herself, but instead give the garments to the lady of the bedchamber, who in turn helped the queen put it on. The procedure was the same in other issues.

The post of a lady of the bedchamber was considered prestigious, and the appointments have therefore been subjected to controversies. Queen Anne appointed Sarah Churchill, Duchess of Marlborough, to this position; the Duchess was widely considered an influential royal favourite. In 1839, concerns that Queen Victoria was determined to surround herself with wives of Whig politicians led to the Bedchamber crisis, preventing the installation of a Tory government under Robert Peel.

Ladies of the bedchamber to the queens of England

This is an incomplete list of those who have served as Lady of the Bedchamber in the English royal household.

Catherine of Aragon, 1509–1536

 Anne Bourchier, Lady Dacre of the South
 Margaret Brent (?), Lady Bergavenny
 Mabel Dacre, Lady Scrope
 Mary Grey, Lady Ferrers of Chartley
 Lady Anne Percy, Lady Maltravers, Countess of Arundel
 Inez de Venegas, Lady Mountjoy (Lord Mountjoy’s 2nd wife)
 Elizabeth Willoughby, Lady Maltravers

Elizabeth I, 1558–1603
1558–1565: Katherine Ashley (née Champernowne), Lady Ashley
1559–1569: Catherine Carey, Lady Knollys, also 1st Cousin or half-Sister to Elizabeth I 
1564: Catherine Paget, Baroness of Beaudesert 
1568–1599: Elizabeth Stafford
1587 Frances Newton, Baroness Cobham

Anne of Denmark, 1603–1619
Anne of Denmark was Queen Consort to James I of England.

 1603–1619: Lucy Russell, Countess of Bedford
 1603–1607: Penelope Blount, Countess of Devonshire
 1603–1619: Anne Livingstone, Countess of Eglinton
 1603–1619: Elizabeth Schaw, Countess of Annandale
 1603–1617: Jean Drummond, Countess of Roxburghe
 1603–1619: Bridget Annesley
 1603–1609: Cecily Bulstrode
 1603–1619: Dorothy Bulstrode
 1604–1609: Bridget Markham
 1603–1618: Jane Meautys
 1604–1619: Mary Middlemore
 1608–1619: Dorothy Silken

Henrietta Maria of France, 1625–1649
Henrietta Maria was Queen Consort to Charles I of England. Queen Henrietta Maria had a French Household when she first arrived in England in 1625, and it was not until her French entourage was sent home in 1626-1627 that her English Household was fully installed. 

 1626: Elizabeth Conquest (née Thimbelby), daughter of Sir Richard Thimelby of Irnham, married Sir Richard Conquest of Houghton Conquest
 1626: Lucy Hay, Countess of Carlisle
 1626: Katherine Villiers, Duchess of Buckingham
 1626: Mary Hamilton, Marchioness of Hamilton 
 1626: Mary Beaumont, Countess of Buckinham
 1626: Isabella Rich, Countess of Holland
 1626: Elisabeth, Viscountess Savage, Countess of Rivers

Catherine of Braganza, 1662–1692
Catherine of Braganza was Queen Consort to Charles II of England
1663–1667: Katherine Stanhope, Countess of Chesterfield
1663–1673: Barbara Palmer, Countess of Castlemaine
1663–1681: Barbara Howard, Countess of Suffolk
1663–1688: Mary Villiers, Duchess of Buckingham
1663–1688: Jane Granville, Countess of Bath

Mary of Modena, 1673–1688
Mary of Modena was Queen Consort to James II of England
Elizabeth Herbert, Marchioness of Powis

Mary II, 1689–1694
 1689–1694 : Mary Sackville, Countess of Dorset (1669–1691)
 1689–1694 : Gertrude Savile, Marchioness of Hallifax
 1689–1694 : Frances Lumley, Viscountess Lumley
 1689–1694 : Elizabeth Windsor, Countess of Plymouth
 1689–1694 : Frances Paulet, Countess of Wiltshire
 1691–1694 : Anne Finch, Countess of Nottingham

Ladies of the bedchamber to the queens of Great Britain

Anne, 1702–1714
1702: Mary Butler, Duchess of Ormonde
1702: Marchioness of Hartington
1702: Juliana Boyle, Countess of Burlington
1702: Countess of Scarbrough
1702–1712: Lady Spencer
1702: Elizabeth Seymour, Duchess of Somerset
1702: Lady Hyde
1702: Lady Frescheville
1702: Lady H. Godolphin
1702–1705: Anne Venables-Bertie, Countess of Abingdon
1702: Lady C. Boeverwart
1704–1714: Abigail Masham, Baroness Masham
1704–1712: Anne Spencer, Countess of Sunderland
1712–1714: Anne Venables-Bertie, Countess of Abingdon
1712: Lady Catharine Hyde

Caroline of Ansbach, 1714–1737

Caroline of Ansbach was Queen Consort to George II of Great Britain
1714–1717: Louisa Berkeley, Countess of Berkeley
1714–1717 & 1726: Diana Beauclerk, Duchess of St Albans
1714–1717: Henrietta Paulet, Duchess of Bolton
1714–1717: Mary Montagu, Duchess of Montagu
1714–1724: Mary Cowper, Countess Cowper
1714–1726: Adelhida Talbot, Duchess of Shrewsbury
1714–1737: Elizabeth Sackville, Duchess of Dorset
1717–1717: Elizabeth Montagu, Viscountess Hinchingbrooke
1718–1721: Barbara Herbert, Countess of Pembroke
1718–1724: Henrietta d'Auverquerque, Countess of Grantham
1718–1737: Elizabeth Hervey, Countess of Bristol
1718–1720: Anne Scott, Countess of Deloraine
1722–1722: Jane Capell, Countess of Essex
1724–1737: Frances Seymour, Countess of Hertford
1724–1737: Sarah Lennox, Duchess of Richmond
1725–1737: Anne van Keppel, Countess of Albemarle
1725–1737: Henrietta Fermor, Countess of Pomfret
1725–1737: Mary Herbert, Countess of Pembroke (extra)
1727–1737: Henrietta Louisa Fermor
?–1737: Dorothy Boyle, Countess of Cork (extra)

Charlotte of Mecklenburg-Strelitz, 1761–1818

Charlotte of Mecklenburg-Strelitz was Queen Consort to King George III of Great Britain
1761–1768: Diana St John, Viscountess Bolingbroke
1761–1770: Elizabeth Percy, Countess of Northumberland (Duchess of Northumberland from 1766)
1761–1784: Elizabeth Campbell, Duchess of Hamilton (Duchess of Argyll from 1770)
1761–1791: Elizabeth Howard, Countess of Effingham
1761–1793: Elizabeth Thynne, Viscountess Weymouth (Marchioness of Bath from 1789)
1761–1794: Alicia Wyndham, Countess of Egremont
1768–1782: Isabella Seymour, Countess of Hertford
1770–1801: Mary Darcy, Countess of Holderness
1783–1818: Elizabeth Herbert, Countess of Pembroke and Montgomery
1784–1818: Elizabeth Harcourt, Countess Harcourt
1791–1818: Elizabeth Townshend, Viscountess Sydney
1793–1807: Elizabeth Brudenell, Countess of Cardigan
1794–1818: Jane Stanhope, Countess of Harrington
1801–1818: Mary Parker, Countess of Macclesfield
1807–1813: Henrietta Stanhope, Countess of Chesterfield
1813–1818: Anne Dundas, Viscountess Melville

Ladies of the Bedchamber to the queens of the United Kingdom

Caroline of Brunswick, 1795–1821

Caroline of Brunswick was the wife of George, Prince of Wales, Prince Regent and from 1820 Queen Consort to George IV of the United Kingdom. They separated in 1796 and she died in 1821.
1795–1796: Frances Villiers, Countess of Jersey
1795–1821: Countess of Carnarvon
1795–1821: Marchioness Townshend
1795–1802: Countess Cholmondeley
1808–1817: Lady Charlotte Lindsay
1809–1821: Lady Charlotte Campbell
1809–1813 & 1820–1821: Lady Ann Hamilton

Adelaide of Saxe-Meiningen, 1830–1837

Adelaide of Saxe-Meiningen was Queen Consort to William IV of the United Kingdom
1830–1837: Emily Nugent, Marchioness of Westmeath
1830–1837: Arabella Bourke, Countess of Mayo
1830–1849: Marianne Wellesley, Countess of Mornington
1830–1834: Anna Loftus, Marchioness of Ely (extra 1834–1837)
1830–1837: Emma Brownlow, Countess Brownlow
1830–1837: Lady Harriet Clinton
1833–1836: Harriet Howe, Countess Howe
1836–1837: Harriet Holroyd, Countess of Sheffield

Victoria, 1837–1901
1837–1838: Louisa Petty-FitzMaurice, Marchioness of Lansdowne
1837–1838: Louisa Lambton, Countess of Durham
1837–1841: Maria Phipps, Marchioness of Normanby
1837–1841: Anna Russell, Duchess of Bedford
1837–1842: Sarah Lyttelton, Baroness Lyttelton, then Governess (Lady Superintendent) of the Royal Children 1842–1850.
1837–1842: Frances Noel, Countess of Gainsborough
1837–1851: Emma Portman, Baroness Portman
1837–1854: Anne Caulfield, Countess of Charlemont
1838–1840: Blanche Cavendish, Countess of Burlington
1839-1839: Elizabeth Campbell, Marchioness of Breadalbane
1839–1842: Mary Montagu, Countess of Sandwich
1840–1854 & 1863–1865: Carolina Edgcumbe, Countess of Mount Edgcumbe
1841–1845: Catherine Murray, Countess of Dunmore
1841–1867: Frances Jocelyn, Viscountess Jocelyn (extra 1867–1880)
1842–1842: Susan Broun-Ramsay, Countess of Dalhousie
1842–1843: Charlotte Fitzalan-Howard, Duchess of Norfolk
1842–1855: Charlotte Canning, Countess Canning
1843–1858: Elizabeth Wellesley, Duchess of Wellington
1845–1864: Elizabeth Cuffe, Countess of Desart
1851–1889: Jane Loftus, Marchioness of Ely
1854–1897: Anne Murray, Duchess of Atholl
1854–1900: Jane Spencer, Baroness Churchill
1855–1863: Maria Bosville-Macdonald, Baroness Macdonald
1858–1878: Jane Alexander, Countess of Caledon
1864–1890: Elizabeth Cavendish, Baroness Waterpark
1865–1895: Susanna Innes-Ker, Duchess of Roxburghe
1867–1872: Eliza Agar-Ellis, Viscountess Clifden
1872–1874: Blanche Bourke, Countess of Mayo
1873–1901: Eliza Hay, Countess of Erroll
1874–1885: Julia Abercromby, Baroness Abercromby
1878–1901: Ismania FitzRoy, Baroness Southampton
1885–1901: Emily Russell, Baroness Ampthill
1889–1901: Cecilia Dawnay, Viscountess Downe
1890–1901: Louisa McDonnell, Countess of Antrim
1895–1901: Edith Bulwer-Lytton, Countess of Lytton
1897–1901: Anne Innes-Ker, Duchess of Roxburghe

Alexandra of Denmark, 1901–1925

Alexandra of Denmark was Queen Consort to Edward VII of the United Kingdom
1900–1910: Alice Stanley, Countess of Derby
1901–1910: Louisa McDonnell, Countess of Antrim
1901–1925: Louisa Acheson, Countess of Gosford
1901–1905: Edith Bulwer-Lytton, Countess of Lytton
1901–1911: Cecilia Harbord, Baroness Suffield
1901–1907: Alice Douglas, Countess of Morton (Extra Lady of the Bedchamber 1901–?)
1901–1912: Mary Parker, Countess of Macclesfield (Extra Lady of the Bedchamber 1901–?)
1901–1905: Maud Petty-FitzMaurice, Marchioness of Lansdowne (extra)
1905–1910: Maud Petty-FitzMaurice, Marchioness of Lansdowne
1905–1910: Constance Ashley-Cooper, Countess of Shaftesbury (extra)
1907–1910: Cecily Gascoyne-Cecil, Marchioness of Salisbury
1910–1914: Winifred Hardinge, Baroness Hardinge of Penshurst (extra)
1910–1925: Maud Petty-FitzMaurice, Marchioness of Lansdowne (extra)
1910–1925: Cecily Gascoyne-Cecil, Marchioness of Salisbury (extra)
1910–1925: Alice Stanley, Countess of Derby (extra)
1911–1925: Cecilia Carington, Marchioness of Lincolnshire (Countess Carrington 1911–1912)

Mary of Teck, 1901–1953

Mary of Teck was Queen Consort to George V of the United Kingdom
1901–1902: Ida Bridgeman, Countess of Bradford
1901–1910: Mabell Ogilvy, Countess of Airlie
1902–1910: Mary Cochrane-Baillie, Baroness Lamington
1905–1906: Constance Ashley-Cooper, Countess of Shaftesbury (extra)
1905–1936: Ida Bridgeman, Countess of Bradford (extra)
1906–1913: Constance Ashley-Cooper, Countess of Shaftesbury
1910–1916: Mabell Ogilvy, Countess of Airlie (extra)
1910–1917: Mary Cochrane-Baillie, Baroness Lamington(extra)
1911–1916: Ethel Grenfell, Baroness Desborough
1911–1936: Mary Elliot-Murray-Kynynmound, Countess of Minto
1911–1953: Margaret Russell, Baroness Ampthill
1913–1924: Emily Fortescue, Countess Fortescue
1913–1953: Constance Ashley-Cooper, Countess of Shaftesbury (extra)
1916–1924: Ethel Grenfell, Baroness Desborough (extra)
1916–1953: Mabell Ogilvy, Countess of Airlie
1924–1929: Emily Fortescue, Countess Fortescue (extra)
1924–1936: Ethel Grenfell, Baroness Desborough
1938-1951: Hon. Margaret Blanche Wyndham 
1951-1953: Hon. Margaret Blanche Wyndham (Extra)
1936–1940: Mary Elliot-Murray-Kynynmound, Countess of Minto (extra)
1936–1952: Ethel Grenfell, Baroness Desborough (extra)

Elizabeth Bowes-Lyon, 1937–2002

Elizabeth Bowes-Lyon was Queen Consort to George VI of the United Kingdom
1937–1947: Mary Wilson, Baroness Nunburnholme
1937–1972: Cynthia Spencer, Countess Spencer
1937–1941: Dorothy Wood, Viscountess Halifax
1937–1994: Patricia Smith, Viscountess Hambleden
1941–1945: Beatrice Ormsby-Gore, Baroness Harlech
1945–1967: Beatrice Ormsby-Gore, Baroness Harlech
1947–1979: Katharine Lumley, Countess of Scarbrough
1973–2002: Elizabeth Beckett, Baroness Grimthorpe
1994–2002: Elizabeth Lumley, Countess of Scarbrough

Elizabeth II, 1953–2022
1953–1966: Fortune FitzRoy, Countess of Euston (later the Duchess of Grafton and subsequently Dowager Duchess)
1953–1973: Elizabeth Coke, Countess of Leicester, wife of Thomas Coke, 5th Earl of Leicester
1960–1966: Patricia Nevill, Marchioness of Abergavenny (extra)
1966–1987: Patricia Nevill, Marchioness of Abergavenny
1967–1971: Esmé Baring, née Harmsworth, Countess of Cromer (temporary) wife of Rowland Baring
1967–1969: Sonia Fairfax, Lady Fairfax of Cameron (temporary) (widow of Thomas Fairfax, 13th Lord Fairfax of Cameron)
1971–1993: Esmé Baring, née Harmsworth, Countess of Cromer (extra)
1973–2022: Virginia Ogilvy, Countess of Airlie
1987–2005: Patricia Nevill, Marchioness of Abergavenny (extra)
1987–2021: Diana Maxwell, Baroness Farnham

See also
 Dame du Palais, French equivalent
 Statsfru, Swedish equivalent

References

External links

Positions within the British Royal Household
 
Gendered occupations